The Yungas tyrannulet (Phyllomyias weedeni) is a species of bird in the family Tyrannidae, the tyrant flycatchers. It is, as suggested by its common name, restricted to humid and semi-humid forest in the Yungas of north-western Bolivia and far south-eastern Peru. Although discovered in the early 1990s, it was only formally described in 2008.

The Yungas tyrannulet resembles the planalto tyrannulet, but has a different voice. Being recently described it has not yet been rated by BirdLife International; however, it has been suggested it should be considered vulnerable, because it occurs in low densities within a small range that is subjected to extensive habitat destruction.

References

 Herzog, Kessler & Balderrama. (2008). A new species of tyrannulet (Tyrannidae: Phyllomyias) from Andean foothills in northwest Bolivia and adjacent Peru. Auk 125(2): 265–276.

Yungas tyrannulet
Birds of the Yungas
Yungas tyrannulet